Denis Daly may refer to:

 Denis Daly (Galway politician) (1748–1791), Irish landowner and politician, MP for County Galway, 1783–1792
 Denis Daly (Kerry politician) (died 1965), member of the Dáil, 1933–1937
 Denis Daly (judge) (c. 1638–1721), Irish judge and Privy Councillor 
 Denis Bowes Daly (c. 1745–1821), Irish politician
 Denis St George Daly (1862–1942), Irish polo player
 Denis Daly (hurler) (1876–1947), Irish hurler

See also
 Dennis Daly, South African cricketer